Senator Swift may refer to:

Members of the United States Senate
Benjamin Swift (1781–1847), U.S. Senator from Vermont from 1833 to 1839
George R. Swift (1887–1972), U.S. senator from Alabama in 1946; also served in the Alabama State Senate

United States state senate members
Charles F. Swift (1825–1903), Massachusetts State Senate
Henry Adoniram Swift (1823–1869), Minnesota State Senate
Jane Swift (born 1965), Massachusetts State Senate
Parton Swift (1876–1952), New York State Senate